Lafreniere Park is the largest park in Metairie, Louisiana. The park is funded by local residents surrounding the park, and a few dollars are added onto their water bill every month.

History 
Nicolas Chauvin de la Frenière (senior) received a 5,000 acre (20 km²) land grant from Jean-Baptiste Le Moyne, Sieur de Bienville, which he used to settle with his family. The plantation was then passed on to Nicolas Chauvin de Lafreniere, Jr. who later became Louisiana's Attorney General. Nicolas Chauvin de Lafreniere, Jr. organized a revolt against Spanish rule in 1768. He was subsequently executed for his part in the conspiracy on October 25, 1769.  The land was confiscated by Alejandro O'Reilly afterwards.  On part of this 5,000 acre (20 km²) land grant, the Jefferson Downs Racetrack was eventually built.  The Racetrack remained in operation until 1965 when Hurricane Betsy devastated the area.  Upon destruction of the track, it was rebuilt near Lake Pontchartrain in Kenner, Louisiana.  This left the old site vacant, and the idea of a park for Jefferson Parish was born.  Construction started in 1977, and the park was substantially finished and dedicated in 1982.

Development Timeline

Wildlife 
The park features extensive array of wildlife, including a wide variety of birds, squirrels. turtles, rabbits, raccoons, opossums and coypu (or Nutria).  
Commonly seen species are White Ibis, (Canadian, African, and Chinese) Geese, Black Swan, Black-bellied Whistling Duck, and Great Egret. They are easy to photograph from a distance of about 20 to 30 feet. One side of the park contains a marshland with a wooden walkway cutting through it, allowing travelers to get up close with the wildlife.

Layout 
Two large playgrounds provide a fenced-in area for small children to play, complete with benches and covered tables for their parents. The park is also home to a carousel.

In the middle of the park is a man-made lagoon, with three islands. Pavilion Island is near the center, and contains a large pavilion. Marsh Island is home to much of the park's wildlife and features a boardwalk. Large man-made hills blanket some fields, while leaving others open for various activities, such as disc golf. The largest of these hills, located on the north side of the park near the concert pavilion, is colloquially referred to by locals as Coon Hill, due to the large population of raccoons present in the park. A two-mile walking and jogging track encircles the park, with three stretching gyms located at intervals around it.

A 5-acre dog park is located in the northeast of the park, with separate fenced areas for small and large dogs.

Sports 
Lafreniere Park contains five fields for soccer, two fields for baseball, softball fields and other multi-purpose fields. One side of the park was converted into a frisbee golf course. The park has hosted the Allstate Sugar Bowl High School Lacrosse Classic. It has also hosted rugby and field hockey events. The park is used for cross country meets. The Loyola Wolf Pack men's and women's cross country teams host home meets in the park. Lafreniere is also a popular place for joggers because of the two mile walking track, which is strictly a pedestrian track.  Although the track is for joggers, the park also recognizes the needs for skaters and bikers (referring to bicyclists). Many steps and concrete rails are scattered throughout the park, making these spots ideal places for skateboarders.  Large, usually empty parking lots are converted into skating areas for inline skaters (also known as roller skating).  For bikers and light traffic, the park contains a large road mirroring the inside of the walking track, which is kept smooth and level.

Christmas in the Park 
The park is decorated every December with elaborate light displays, which can be viewed on foot or (for a fee) by vehicle. During the event, children's craft activities are provided near the Pavilion Island parking lots, and local school bands perform on stage.

Ground Photos

References

External links 

 Lafreniere Park Official Site
 Lafreniere Park Photo Gallery - please note, all images on this site are copyrighted and require written consent to use.
 Lafreniere Park History at www.JeffParish.net
 

Parks in Louisiana
Protected areas of Jefferson Parish, Louisiana
Cross country running courses in Louisiana
College cross country courses in the United States
Defunct horse racing venues in Louisiana
Baseball venues in New Orleans
Lacrosse venues in Louisiana
Rugby union stadiums in New Orleans
Soccer venues in New Orleans
Softball venues in New Orleans
Loyola Wolf Pack
Tourist attractions in Jefferson Parish, Louisiana
1982 establishments in Louisiana